NA-117 Lahore -I is a constituency for the National Assembly of Pakistan.

Area
The area includes some of the oldest parts of Lahore, behind the walled city including areas like Matchus Factory, Saeed Park, Qaiser Town, Kot Shahabud Din, Yousuf Park, Wandala Road, Lajpat Road, Jia Musa, Qila Muhammadi, Kot Begum, Sabzi Mandi, Ravi Road, Saggian, and Shahdara.

Members of Parliament

2018-2022: NA-123 Lahore-I

Election 2002 

General elections were held on 10 Oct 2002. Saqib Nawaz Sarwani an Independent candidate won by 25,484 votes.

Election 2008 

General elections were held on 18 Feb 2008.

Election 2013 

General elections were held on 11 May 2013.

Election 2018 

General elections were held on 25 July 2018.

Other contestant parties and candidate as Tehreek-e-Labbaik Pakistan won 23,962, and Independent candidate Faraz Hashmi won 971 votes, Wahid Ahmad won 414 votes, Zaman Ali won 290 votes, Amjad khan won 123 votes, and Humayun Akhtar khan won 70 votes.

See also
NA-116 Sheikhupura-IV
NA-118 Lahore-II

References 

Check complete NA 123 Election Result 2018 and 2013 with Candidates List

External links 
 Election result's official website

NA-118